Shemurshinsky District  (Şămărşă rayonĕ) is an administrative and municipal district (raion), one of the twenty-one in the Chuvash Republic, Russia. It is located in the south and southwest of the republic. Its administrative center is the rural locality (a selo) of Shemursha. Population:  16,588 (2002 Census);  The population of Shemursha accounts for 25.5% of the district's total population.

Notable residents 

Nikolai Ilbekov (1915–1981, born in Trekhizb-Shemursha, Buinsky Uyezd), writer
Fedor Madurov (1942–2022, born in Baskaki), sculptor and graphic artist

References

Notes

Sources

Districts of Chuvashia